Murray-Calloway County Airport , also known as Kyle-Oakley Field, is a public use airport located  northwest of the central business district of Murray, in Calloway County, Kentucky, United States. The airport opened in 1961. It is owned by the Murray City-Calloway County Board.

History
The need for an airport for Murray and Calloway County was apparent to further the growth and progress of the community. The Murray Chamber of Commerce knew of the interest which the Murray Jaycees had in working to obtain an airport. In the spring of 1957 the Murray Chamber of Commerce approached the Jaycees to offer their assistance and cooperation if the Jaycees would undertake the airport project. The Jaycees endorsed the project and a committee was appointed after approval by the board of directors. A campaign was established to obtain approval from the State Department of Aeronautics, with local residents, businesses and interested parties writing letters and making phone calls. The result was an approval to continue with the project. The Jaycees held a radio auction for the purpose of raising funds for the airport project. With the success of the auction it was evident that there would be an airport for Murray and Calloway County. On Saturday, October 28, 1961, Kentucky Governor Bert T. Combs dedicated the airport in a ceremony attended by state and local officials as well as many local citizens.

In the mid 1980s, a commuter type service called Sunbird Airlines had scheduled flights to Nashville using single engine Piper PA-32 aircraft. They lasted about four years.

Facilities and aircraft
It has one runway designated 5/23 with an asphalt surface measuring 6,203 by 100 feet (1,891 x 30 m).

For the 12-month period ending September 30, 2009, the airport had 13,171 aircraft operations, an average of 36 per day: 93% general aviation, 6% air taxi, and 1% military. At that time there were 33 aircraft based at this airport: 88% single-engine, 6% multi-engine, 3% helicopter and 3% ultralight.

References

External links
 Aerial photo as of 6 April 1998 from USGS The National Map
 
 

Airports in Kentucky
Buildings and structures in Calloway County, Kentucky
Transportation in Calloway County, Kentucky